The Manning Cabin was the first vacation cabin built in what is now Saguaro National Park. The log structure was built by Levi H. Manning, Surveyor General of the Arizona Territory and later mayor of Tucson, in 1905. From 1922 to 1939 it was used by the U.S. Forest Service to house fire and trail crews, and for the same purpose by the National Park Service from the park's establishment in 1940.

References

Residential buildings on the National Register of Historic Places in Arizona
Buildings and structures in Pima County, Arizona
Log cabins in the United States
National Register of Historic Places in Pima County, Arizona
Log buildings and structures on the National Register of Historic Places in Arizona